Mawlamyine Township is a township of Mawlamyine District in the Mon State of Myanmar. The principal town is Mawlamyine.

Demographics

2014

The 2014 Myanmar Census reported that Mawlamyine Township had a population of 289,388. The population density was 1,322.6 people per km2. The census reported that the median age was 29.2 years, and 93 males per 100 females. There were 57,457 households; the mean household size was 4.7.

The Pa-Auk Forest Monastery is located in the village of Pa-Auk.

References

Townships of Mon State